Campbell Hatton (born 9 January 2001) is a British professional boxer. He is the son of former two-division world champion of boxing, Ricky Hatton and nephew of Matthew Hatton.

Early life 
Hatton was born in Lancashire, United Kingdom where he is the son of former multi-time world champion Ricky Hatton.

Professional career

Early career 
Campbell made his debut on the undercard of Alexander Povetkin vs. Dillian Whyte II on 27 March 2021 where he defeated Spanish boxer, Jesus Ruiz by points decision (PTS).

During the undercard of Anthony Joshua vs. Oleksandr Usyk on 25 September 2021, Hatton defeated Sonni Martinez by a controversial points decision victory.

Hatton received his first knockout victory after knocking out Hungarian boxer, Attila Csereklye on 3 December 2021.

Personal life 
He is a supporter of Manchester City FC, and he wears the club's logo on his shorts during fights.

Professional boxing record

See also
List of boxing families#Hatton family

References

External links 
 

Living people
2001 births
English male boxers
Boxers from Manchester
Lightweight boxers